The Erlenmeyer–Plöchl azlactone and amino acid synthesis, named after Friedrich Gustav Carl Emil Erlenmeyer who partly discovered the reaction, is a series of chemical reactions which transform an N-acyl glycine to various other amino acids via an oxazolone (also known as an azlactone).

Hippuric acid, the benzamide derivative of glycine, cyclizes in the presence of acetic anhydride, condensing to give 2-phenyl-oxazolone. This intermediate also has two acidic protons and reacts with benzaldehyde, acetic anhydride and sodium acetate to a so-called azlactone. This compound on reduction gives access to phenylalanine.

Variations 
Variants of the azlactone synthesis in which analogues of azlactones are used are sometimes advantageous. Hydantoin (in Bergmann modification), thiohydantoin and rhodanine have each been employed as the enolate-forming component of the condensation. 
 
2,5-Diketopiperazine can be used as a methylene component as well; its condensation products with aromatic aldehydes, on reduction and hydrolysis give the corresponding amino acids.

Scope
In one study the Erlenmeyer amino acid synthesis was used in the heart of an L-m-tyrosine synthesis

See also
Dakin-West reaction
Perkin reaction

References

Condensation reactions
Heterocycle forming reactions
Name reactions
Chemical synthesis of amino acids